Mulawa may refer to:

 Mulawa Correctional Centre, a correctional facility in Australia
 Mulawa, Uganda, a neighborhood in Kira Town, Wakiso District, Uganda.